Streptomyces glomeratus is a bacterium species from the genus of Streptomyces. Streptomyces glomeratus produces beromycin and nogalamycin.

See also 
 List of Streptomyces species

References

Further reading

External links
Type strain of Streptomyces glomeratus at BacDive -  the Bacterial Diversity Metadatabase

glomeratus
Bacteria described in 1986